The AM5-M2 and AM4-M4 are two series of Alstom Metropolis heavy rail rolling stock that operate on lines M2 and M4 of the Budapest Metro.

Since 2009, 22 AM5-M2 sets have been constructed for use on Line M2 with delivery to be completed by 2013. A further 22 AM4-M4 sets have been constructed since 2012 for use on Line M4 with delivery due to be completed by 2014.

On December 5th, 2016, an accident occurred on Metro Line M2 which involved an AM5-M2 rolling stock. An incoming train collided with a waiting train at the Pillangó utca metro station. This was the first serious accident in the history of the Budapest metro. The accident did not result in a fatality, but according to the prosecution, a total of twenty-one were injured, five of whom were classified as serious. The unit was scrapped soon after the accident. When the trains were received in 2010, it was revealed most units came totally defective which delayed their entry to revenue service. The accident on December 5th, 2016, was eventually the result of a braking system failure on the AM5-M2 unit. The similar units on line M4 came 99.8% reliable, and no defects present in them.

References

Budapest Metro
Alstom multiple units